Richard A. Schulz (January 3, 1917 – June 26, 1998) was an American professional basketball player.

Schulz attended Washington Park High School in Racine, Wisconsin. He attended the University of Wisconsin–Madison during the 1936–37 season but did not play on the varsity basketball team.

A 6'2" forward/guard, Schulz played four seasons (1946–1950) in the Basketball Association of America (BAA) and National Basketball Association (NBA) as a member of the Cleveland Rebels, Toronto Huskies, Baltimore Bullets, Washington Capitols, Tri-Cities Blackhawks, and Sheboygan Red Skins.  He averaged 5.6 points per game in his BAA/NBA career and won a BAA championship with Baltimore in 1948.

BAA/NBA career statistics

Regular season

Playoffs

References

External links

1917 births
1998 deaths
American men's basketball players
American expatriate basketball people in Canada
Baltimore Bullets (1944–1954) players
Basketball players from Wisconsin
Cleveland Rebels players
Sheboygan Red Skins players
Shooting guards
Small forwards
Sportspeople from Racine, Wisconsin
Tri-Cities Blackhawks players
Toronto Huskies players
Washington Capitols players